Synochoneura ochriclivis is a species of moth of the family Tortricidae. It is found in Zhejiang, China.

References

	

Moths described in 1931
Archipini